The Bumblebee Flies Anyway is a 1999 film starring Elijah Wood and directed by Martin Duffy. It is based on the novel of the same name by Robert Cormier.

Plot
Barney Snow (Elijah Wood) wakes up in a hospital with no memory of why he is there. All he has is his name and some vague recollections of a car crash. He assumes that he is in the hospital for his amnesia and settles in to try to recover. He quickly realizes that all of the other residents of the youth clinic are all suffering from terminal illnesses.

Another patient, Mazzo (Joseph Perrino), asks Barney to play host for his visiting twin sister Cassie (Rachael Leigh Cook). Barney immediately falls for Cassie and strives to get better, if only to be able to see her in a setting outside the hospital. He is determined to learn about his past so that he can make her a part of his future.

In his explorations, both inside his shattered memories and through the physical rooms of the hospital, Barney starts to realize that there was no car crash. Doctor Harriman (Janeane Garofalo) induced amnesia in Barney to make him forget everything in his past. Barney demands to know why, and Harriman tells him he has cancer. The experimental procedure that Barney is undergoing is attempting to test the power of the mind in fighting cancer. Barney had volunteered for the treatment, hoping for a miracle cure.

The theory was that if Barney did not know he had cancer, the body might stop creating the cancer cells. The explanation Harriman gives comes from an old myth that, based on weight ratios to wing power and wind resistance, the bumblebees should be aerodynamically incapable of flight — yet the bumblebee doesn’t know that, so it flies anyway.

Torn between his hope for a cure and his desire to continue his budding relationship with Cassie, Barney is forced to choose whether to go through the amnesia procedure again or remain with the memories and knowledge he has thus far acquired.

Cast
Elijah Wood as Barney Snow
Janeane Garofalo as Dr. Harriman/Handyman
Rachael Leigh Cook as Cassie
George O. Gore II as Billy
Joseph Perrino as Mazzo/Berto
Roger Rees as Dr. Croft
Oni Faida Lampley as Nurse Bascam
Jeffrey Force as Allie Roon
Christopher Mark Petrizzo as Chris Ronson
Samuel Haft as Samuel Ronson
John E. Mack as Willy/Orderly

References

External links

1999 films
1990s teen drama films
American teen drama films
Films based on American novels
1999 drama films
Films produced by Steven Haft
Films scored by Christopher Tyng
1990s English-language films
1990s American films